Syria requires its residents to register their motor vehicles and display vehicle registration plates. Since the start of the Syrian civil war in 2011 and the fragmentation of control and governance in the Syrian territory, there has been parallel license plate formats introduced in various regions of Syria by the de facto rulers.

Current Series
The Syrian license plates since 1997 have black lettering on a white background. The plate is divided into 4 sections (when viewed from left to right):

 The left-most section: At the top the name of the province in Arabic and below that the registration number (a maximum of 6 digits) in Arabic numerals. The provinces are as follows:
The vertical strip: Country code SYR is written in Latin script.
The second vertical strip: "Syria" is written in Arabic script.
The right-most strip: The same registration number from the left-most area is written in Eastern Arabic numerals

Private
Private vehicles are black on white.

Privately owned and run public transit is mostly run by taxis. Taxi license plates are red on white.

Public owned and run public transit is mostly run by city buses. Bus license plates are black on red.

Rental vehicles that come with drivers have license plates that are white on blue.

Rental vehicles without a driver have license plate with a mix of white on blue and black on white (similar to private vehicles).

Transit vehicles license plates are black on yellow.

Motorcycle license plates are smaller in size, and are only in Arabic. They show the governorate name, and the term دارجة آلية, meaning motor bike. They have a white background and black text, and consist of a 5-digit number.

Agricultural license plates, installed on tractors and other farm equipment are smaller in size (same size as the motorcycle plates), and are only in Arabic. They show the governorate name, and the term زراعية, meaning agricultural. They have a white background and black text, and consist of a 5-digit number.

AANES (Rojava)
Autonomous Administration of North and East Syria (AANES), more commonly known as Rojava, is a de facto autonomous subnational entity set up by the Syrian Democratic Forces in the Northern and Eastern parts of Syria. This entity also issues its own license plates. Adjacent to the code "SYR", the license plates also show the two-letter code "BS", separated by a Kurdish Sun. "BS" stands for "Bakurê Sûriyê", Kurdish for "Northern Syria". The background of the national ("SYR") and regional ("B*S") match that of the plate itself, and the text color matches the text of the plate.

Prior to the above standardization, in the earlier versions of AANES license plates, instead of "B*S", a regional code "R*" was shown, standing for "Rojavayê Kurdistanê" meaning "Western Kurdistan", which isn't inclusive of the Arab residents of the region, that after the defeat of ISIS, ended up becoming the majority of the population of the region. Furthermore, previously the background color behind the regional code was green previously, and the Kurdish Sun was colored yellow. The color scheme of the plate has since then been simplified.

The plates consist of 6 digits. In contrast with the format used by the Damascus government, Latin numbers take precedence and are on the top, while Arabic numbers are at the bottom.

License plates of AANES no longer show governorates, instead showing Regions of the AANES (with the exception of Jazira Region (Qamishli)) in Arabic and a 3-letter Latin code derived from Kurdish.

As for the Jazira Region, license plates are issued for each of the Districts under its jurisdiction, bearing in mind that Ras al-Ayn (Sere Kaniye) District is under Turkish occupation. Alongside Arabic names and 3-letter Kurdish codes, license plates of Jazira Region also generally show jurisdiction names in the Syriac Language of the ethnic Assyrian Minority of the region. For example, for the district of Qamishli, the 4-letter Syriac code "ܩ ܡ ܫ ܐ" is used, four disconnected letters that are meant to be an abbreviation of the Syriac name of Qamishli, "ܩܡܫܠܐ". For the district of Hasaka, the full name of the district in Syriac, "ܚܣܝܟܐ" is used.

The displayed Arabic names of the regions do not match the common and officially-recognized (by the Damascus government). For example, for Qamishli, instead of القامشلي (Al-Qamishli), the name قامشلو (Qamishlo) is shown. Same applies to Kobani, known in Arabic as "Ayn al-Arab".

Below is the list of the regions and their display names.

There are four general vehicle classifications under AANES jurisdiction, private, commercial, police, and administrative.

Passenger vehicle plates have a white background and blue text.

Motorcycle license plates have a reduced size. They still show the jurisdiction in both Arabic and Kurdish (but not Syriac). They do not show the national identifier "SYR", but do show "B*S" (Northern Syria) regional identifier. They consist of a latin letter and 4 digits.

Commercial vehicles, such as buses, taxis, and trucks, have license plates with white background and red text.

Vehicles of security forces, such as Asayish forces and Sutoro forces, have plates that are blue with white text.

Administrative license plates, issued on municipal and other civilian governmental vehicles (like fire trucks and ambulances), have a green background and white text.

Syrian rebels

There are two distinct but cooperating political entities in Northern and Northwestern Syria that are generally referred to as "Syrian Rebels". Syrian Salvation Government is a de facto Hayat Tahrir al-Sham-dominated government headquartered in Idlib Governorate, controlling much of the governorate and small portions of western Aleppo Governorate. Syrian Interim Government is a Turkish-backed de facto and interim government established in the territories that the Turkish Army has occupied in Northern Aleppo Governorate, portions of Northern Raqqa Governorate and Northwestern Hasaka Governorate. Much of the territory these has been under rebel control as far back as 2012. Other portions, such as Northern Raqqa Governorate have only been recently occupied by Turkey and its allies recently (2019).

Both of these entities have started issuing their own license plates. However, despite similarities and cooperation between Syrian Salvation Government and the Turkish-backed Syrian Interim Government in Northern Syria, the two entities are separate, and thus issue separate license plates. This has caused difficulty for the citizens and has hindered freedom of movement in the so-called "liberated" areas of Syria.

"Syrian Salvation Government"
Hayat Tahrir al-Sham-dominated entity, the Syrian Salvation Government (SSG) rules over much of Idlib Governorate, including its capital city of Idlib, and a small section of Aleppo Governorate, namely the two areas of Darat Izza and Atarib. (See :Template:Syrian Civil War detailed map for more information).

The license plates for the area under the control of this entity are issued based on governorates, similar to the practice in areas under the rule of the Damascus-based government. However, the configuration and style has changed significantly. The name of the governorate is written in Arabic, on the right hand side. The "SYR" national identity strip has been maintained in the middle, but a 3-letter governorate identity strip has been added.

 IDL for Idlib Governorate
 ALP for Aleppo Governorate

The plates keep 6 digits. But the number is now solely shown in Latin, and not in Arabic. The number is only shown on the left hand side.

Passenger vehicle plates have a white background and black text, similar to other existing configurations in Syria, including that of the Damascus-based government.

Commercial vehicle plates have a white background and red text.

Police vehicle license plates do not show the governorate. They simply show the Arabic word "الشرطة" (Al-Shurta) meaning "Police". They have a yellow background and blue-coloured text. Their numbers consist of 4 digits.

"Syrian Interim Government"
Syrian Interim Government, the political entity set up and supported by Turkey after its invasion and occupation of portions of Aleppo Governorate, Raqqa Governorate, and Hasaka Governorate has introduced its own license plates as well. Turkish-backed Syrian Interim Government decided to start issuing its own license plates in great part due to the plan to integrate the vehicle registration database of the regions under its jurisdiction with the vehicle registration database of Turkish Police in each of the neighboring provinces.

Syrian Interim Government license plates are fully bilingual, displaying Arabic text and numbers, alongside Turkish text and numbers (and a complete exclusion of Kurdish in Turkish-occupied Afrin and Ras al-Ayn), in line with the Turkish policy of Turkification of the region.

License plates of Syrian Interim government no longer show the name or 3-letter code for Syria. They do show the name of the governorate in Arabic and in Turkish. Furthermore they show the name of the "local council" in which the vehicle is registered. These "local councils" generally match Syrian subdistricts with exceptions such as Al-Bab Subdistrict that has been divided into three "local councils" of al-Bab, Bizaah, and Qabasin. Each subdistrict is also shown with a 3-letter Turkish code. The numbers on the plates are 5-digits, starting with 00001. While license plate configurations from localities in all of the three Turkish-occupied governorates of Aleppo, Raqqa, and Hasaka have the same elements and very similar configuration, their designs (font, orientation of text, size of letters, etc) differ slightly.

Below are the (incomplete) list of local councils, their Arabic display names and their 3-letter Turkish display codes.

Passenger vehicle plates have a white background and black text, similar to other existing configurations in Syria, including that of the Damascus-based government.

Motorcycle plates have smaller less elongated shape, and have a white background and black text.

Commercial vehicle plates have a white background and red text.

Administrative license plates, issued on municipal and other civilian governmental vehicles (like fire trucks and ambulances), have a black background and white text.

License plates issued to police and law enforcement vehicles and other such vehicles have a blue background and white text.

License plates installed on vehicles of "Syrian National Army" (SNA) also known as "TFSA" (Turkish-backed Free Syrian Army) have a green background and white text. These license plates do not display governorate and locality name, instead they show the name and logo of the "Syrian National Army" . These license plates display a 3-letter Turkish code "SMO", standing for the Turkish translation of the name of SNA Suriye Millî Ordusu.

Comparison of formats

References

Road transport in Syria
Syria